Gordon Collins is a character in the Channel 4 soap-opera Brookside.  He was portrayed by Nigel Crowley from the show's debut in 1982 until 1984 and later on by Mark Burgess beginning in 1986 and ending with his departure in 1990.  Gordon is notable for being the first openly gay character on a British television soap opera.

Storylines

Background
Gordon Collins moved to Brookside Close aged 14 with his family in 1982 after his father, Paul (Jim Wiggins) loses his job.  While Lucy (Katrin Cartlidge) struggles to fit in on Brookside Close (which she refers to as 'purgatory'), Gordon settles in quicker.  Gordon is seen by Paul and his mother Annabelle (Doreen Sloane) as having better prospects than Lucy and so when they can only afford to allow one to remain at independent school, Gordon stays while Lucy has to attend the sixth-form college at Brookside Comprehensive, where she is bullied.

Arrival
After the Collins' arrival, Gordon begins writing computer software, a hobby shared by Alan Partridge (Dicken Ashworth).  For sometime he gave his parents little cause for concern, unlike Lucy who was having an affair with a married man much to Annabelle and Paul's disapproval. Gordon also provided a contrast to Damon Grant (Simon O'Brien), who was his counterpart in the Grant family.  While Damon was hot-headed, often skipped school and spent his time on the football terraces and getting into scrapes with his friends, Gordon was quiet, studious and appeared to have few friends.

Homosexuality
In 1985, Gordon came out as being gay after Annabelle found out about the homosexual relationship he had been having with Chris Duncan (Stifyn Parri).  While Annabelle and Paul eventually accepted his homosexuality, it was a source of embarrassment for them. In 1986, Gordon leaves to live in France with Lucy who had been living there with Barry Grant (Paul Usher) for some time.  He returns with a girl, prompting Paul and Annabelle to assume he is now straight.  This however is not the case and it transpires that the girl is the sister of a lover Gordon had in France.

In 1987 Gordon and Chris come into possession of a stolen car with which they run over the dog that Paul saved from drowning.  Paul however assumes that Terry Sullivan (Brian Regan) killed the dog and photographs him and Pat Hancock (David Easter) working, and sends the evidence to the DSS.

In 1988 the Collins' house is attacked by 'queer-bashers', who graffiti 'If AIDS don't get you - we will' and 'shirtlifters live here' on the garage door.

Reception
Geoffrey Phillips of the Evening Standard branded the character "Gordon the glum".

References

Brookside characters
Fictional gay males
Television characters introduced in 1982